The Edel Mountain is a South Korean single-place, paraglider that was designed and produced by Edel Paragliders of Gwangju. It is now out of production.

Design and development
The Mountain was designed as a lightweight mountaineering descent glider.

The models are each named for their relative size.

Variants
Mountain 8000 M
Mid-sized model for medium-weight pilots. The glider model is DHV 1 certified.
Mountain 8000 L
Large-sized model for heavier pilots. Its wing has an aspect ratio is 4.8:1. The glider model is DHV 1 certified.

Specifications (Mountain M)

References

Mountain
Paragliders